Campbell's Soup Cans is the first of a series of works of art by Andy Warhol.

Campbell's Soup Cans may also refer to:
Campbell's Soup Cans II, another Warhol work in the series, in the collection of the Museum of Contemporary Art, Chicago
Soup cans produced by the Campbell Soup Company